The Communication Workers Union (CWU) is the main trade union in the United Kingdom for people working for telephone, cable, digital subscriber line (DSL) and postal delivery companies. It has 110,000 members in Royal Mail as well as more in many other communication companies.

Formed in 1995, by the merger of the Union of Communication Workers and National Communications Union, its current general secretary is Dave Ward.

Sectors
CWU members work for Royal Mail, the Post Office, BT, O2, Sky, Accenture HR Services, EE, Virgin Media and other communication companies. Members' expertise includes engineering, computing, clerical, mechanical, driving, retail, financial and manual skills.

The CWU established the United Tech and Allied Workers to represent workers in the technology industry.

Royal Mail industrial action

2007

The basis of the strike was a disagreement over pay and pensions. On 7 June 2007, the union's postal members voted by 77.5% to strike after a 2.5% pay rise coupled with £350 million every year for five years (totalling £1.5 billion) of cuts was offered. They took their first one-day strike on 29 June 2007, and the second on 12 July and 13 July. The action then progressed to a series of rolling strikes.

2009
Further industrial action was taken in 2009.  An overwhelming three to one vote in favour backed the dispute and two days of national strike action were called in October 2009. This followed significant periods of local strike action in London, Bristol and areas of Scotland. Following the national days of action, the TUC were involved in brokering an "interim agreement" that provided a "period of calm" for the union and Royal Mail to negotiate a full and final agreement on the introduction of modernisation and relevant working practices. Following the interim agreement, strike action was suspended and talks held under the auspices of Acas.

In December 2009, a national agreement was struck and a ballot of the membership on an agreement on pay and working conditions was carried out. This agreement was overwhelmingly supported by CWU members in January 2010. The agreement increased pay and changed working arrangements, particularly in delivery. The agreement was headed "business transformation" and discussions and implementation arrangements continued nationally and in each workplace on the detail of the agreement. As a result, both the union and Royal Mail claimed to have agreed a fully funded modernisation plan.

BT Industrial Action

2010 BT Industrial Dispute

In early 2010 the CWU balloted all of its BT employed members for strike action over a pay claim for 2010.  The ballot result was never announced due to legal challenges but following extensive negotiations CWU reached an agreed settlement on pay with BT.  A national ballot of members overwhelmingly agreed the pay deal.

2021 RPE Industrial Dispute & Strike

On 24 February 2021, 170 BT Openreach employees commenced a total of three weeks strike action in opposition to the companies unagreed changes to their Terms & Conditions, along with proposals that could impact taxpayer expenditure for public funded projects.

CWU Deputy General Secretary, Andy Kerr commented that "the fact that management’s total intransigence on the issue has resulted in the first industrial action anywhere in BT Group for 22 years tells its own story."

The staff involved were Repayment Project Engineers (RPE). Their job involved diverting and/or protecting BT cables during major building works, including local authority and  government schemes.

To date, the industrial dispute has not been settled and is still debated at executive level.

2022 BT & Openreach Industrial Dispute & Strike

In June 2022, the CWU conducted its first company-wide industrial action ballot in BT Group since 1987. In Openreach, where 28,425 CWU members were entitled to vote, participants recorded a 95.8% ‘yes’ vote for industrial action on a 74.8% turnout.  In BT, where 10,353 were issued with ballot papers, another ‘yes’ vote of 91.5% was recorded on a 58.2% turnout.

The CWU hoped that such an overwhelming demonstration of workforce anger would persuade management back to the negotiating table were, however, met with BT categorically refusing to re-open 2022 pay negotiations.

As a result, the first national industrial action in BT Group for three and a half decades took place on July 29 and August 1 – with the all-out strike days being solidly observed by members in both BT and Openreach.

Two further all-out strike days took place Tuesday August 30 and Wednesday August 31. 

Following this, another four days of strike action was announced for Thursday 6 October, Monday 10 October, Thursday 20 October and Monday 24 October.

The dispute, which involves more than 40,000 CWU members working for BT and Openreach, was triggered by BT’s unilateral imposition of real-terms pay cuts for all CWU-represented grades.

Affiliations

Labour Party
The CWU has long been affiliated with the Labour Party; for example Alan Johnson, a previous General Secretary, later became a Labour Member of Parliament (MP) and ultimately held a number of Cabinet posts including Home Secretary. Since 2001, the CWU has donated over £9million to the Labour Party but relationships became strained over Labour plans to privatise Royal Mail in 2007 and Dave Ward, the CWU's representative on the Labour Party's National Executive Committee announced he was stepping down from this role because he believed it conflicted with the interests of union members. He was replaced by Andy Kerr.

At the CWU Annual Conference 2008 there was much debate about the union's relationship with Labour. It was agreed, and remains union policy that a ballot would be held to cease funds to the party if privatisation of postal services took place.  As the privatisation proposal from the Labour government in 2009, the Postal Services Bill, was defeated through the unions campaign, led by the left wing Labour loyalist and long term General Secretary Billy Hayes, with the support of Labour backbenchers, affiliation has remained in place.

Since the election of the Conservative–Liberal Democrat coalition government the union has sought to re-define its relationship with the Labour Party.  In July 2010 the union's National Executive Committee agreed to nominate and support Ed Balls MP for Labour leader in the 2010 leadership ballot.  In turn, Ed Balls MP supported the unions Keep The Post Public campaign in the summer of 2010 in opposition of the planned coalition government's intention to privatise Royal Mail.

In September 2015, CWU endorsed Jeremy Corbyn's campaign in the Labour Party leadership election.

In August 2017, it was announced that the organisation will formally affiliate to Momentum after its ruling executive voted unanimously in favour to join the organisation. General secretary Dave Ward, told the New Statesman that "the general election showed the value of Momentum as part of the wider labour movement", and that the body, which emerged from Corbyn's 2015 leadership campaign, was now "a major political force in the UK", saying it had a  "key role to play in securing a transformative Labour government".

1st Class Credit Union

1st Class Credit Union Limited was formed in 1992, as Glasgow District Postal Workers Credit Union, it became the Scottish Postal Workers Credit Union in 1998, before adopting the present name in 2007. A member of the Association of British Credit Unions Limited, it is open to members and employees of the CWU.

The credit union is authorised by the Prudential Regulation Authority and regulated by the Financial Conduct Authority and the PRA. Ultimately, like the banks and building societies, members’ savings are protected against business failure by the Financial Services Compensation Scheme.

In 2016, it was awarded a large grant of £60,000 by the Lloyds Banking Group Credit Union Development Fund to strengthen its capital asset ratio.

Leadership
The following people have served as General Secretary of the Communication Workers Union:
1995: Alan Johnson (UCW) and Tony Young (NCU) jointly
1997: Derek Hodgson and Tony Young
1998: Derek Hodgson
2001: Billy Hayes
2015: Dave Ward

The second most senior official is the Senior Deputy General Secretary:
1998: Tony Young
2001: Tony Kearns

References

External links

Catalogue of the CWU archives, held at the Modern Records Centre, University of Warwick
Coverage from Socialist Worker plus leaflets, by Socialist Workers Party (UK)
Coverage from LibCom.org, by LibCom.org
1st Class Credit Union

Trade unions in the United Kingdom
Trade unions established in 1995
Communications trade unions
1995 establishments in the United Kingdom
Credit unions of the United Kingdom
Trade unions affiliated with the Labour Party (UK)
London Borough of Merton
Trade unions based in London
Trade unions affiliated with the Trades Union Congress